A penumbral lunar eclipse took place on Saturday, August 8, 1998, the second of three lunar eclipses that year.

Visibility

Related lunar eclipses

Eclipses of 1998 
 A total solar eclipse on February 26.
 A penumbral lunar eclipse on March 13.
 A penumbral lunar eclipse on August 8.
 An annular solar eclipse on August 22.
 A penumbral lunar eclipse on September 6.

Lunar year series

Saros series 

According to some sources, this lunar eclipse was the final member of Saros series 109. According to other sources, the next event in the series occurred on August 18, 2016. The previous occurrence was on July 27, 1980.

See also 
List of lunar eclipses
List of 20th-century lunar eclipses

External links 
 Saros cycle 109
 

1998-08
1998 in science
August 1998 events